Fusiliers Museum may refer to:

Fusilier Museum, Bury, Greater Manchester
Fusiliers Museum (London), Tower of London
Fusiliers Museum of Northumberland, Alnwick, Northumberland
Royal Irish Fusiliers Museum, Armagh, County Armagh, Northern Ireland; see 
Royal Regiment of Fusiliers Museum (Royal Warwickshire), Warwick, Warwickshire
Royal Welch Fusiliers Museum, Caernarfon, Gwynedd, Wales